The 1931 International cricket season was from April 1931 to August 1931.

Season overview

June

New Zealand in England

Scotland in Ireland

August

England in Netherlands

Netherlands in Belgium

References

1931 in cricket